The Chittenden County Superior Courthouse, formerly the U.S. Post Office and Custom House, is a historic government building at 175 Main Street in downtown Burlington, Vermont. It was built in 1906 and was designed by James Knox Taylor in the Beaux-Arts style.  Known in the 1970s as the Smith-Goldberg U.S. Army Reserve Center, it served historically as a custom house and post office. It currently houses the Chittenden County Superior Court, after the previous county courthouse burned down in 1982.

Description and history
The Chittenden County Superior Courthouse stands in downtown Burlington, at the southeast corner of Church and Main Streets.  It is a large three-story masonry structure, its exterior finished in marble and dressed granite.  The principal facade faces Main Street, and is five bays wide.  The ground floor appears as a basement level, with large blocks of marble in horizontal bands and stylized arching over the window openings.  The second and third floors, which are in a U shape opening to the south, have windows (tall on the second floor, short on the third) articulated by paired Ionic columns.  The building is crowned by an entablature, dentillated cornice, and low balustrade.

The federal government built this facility in 1906, which is one of the state's finest examples of Beaux-Arts architecture. Until 1972 it served as a post office, custom house and federal courthouse.  From 1963 until 1972 as the Smith-Goldberg Army Reserve Center) and remained in the Federal inventory. In 1972 The Treasury Department declared the building surplus, and it was acquired by in 1974 by Chittenden County.  It presently houses the Chittenden County Superior Court and other judicial functions.

Gallery

See also
National Register of Historic Places listings in Chittenden County, Vermont

References

External links

Historic Federal Courthouses page from the Federal Judicial Center

Beaux-Arts architecture in Vermont
Government buildings completed in 1906
Courthouses in Vermont
Post office buildings in Vermont
Former post office buildings
Former federal courthouses in the United States
Buildings and structures in Burlington, Vermont
Post office buildings on the National Register of Historic Places in Vermont
Custom houses in the United States
National Register of Historic Places in Burlington, Vermont
Custom houses on the National Register of Historic Places
Government buildings on the National Register of Historic Places in Vermont
1906 establishments in Vermont